The Ross H. Blakely House is a Queen Anne style house located in Kingman, Arizona. The house is listed on the National Register of Historic Places.

Description 
The Ross H. Blakely House is located at 519 Spring Street in Kingman, Arizona. The home was built in 1897 and it is a Queen Anne style. Ross Blakeley was the son of William G. Blakely.  He passed the bar in 1910 and started his practice. He also did some ranching. He served in county and territorial positions and was very active in the civic affairs of Kingman.  The home was added to the National Register of Historic Places in 1988.

References

Houses completed in 1897
Houses in Kingman, Arizona
Houses on the National Register of Historic Places in Arizona
National Register of Historic Places in Kingman, Arizona